Qarqatuiyeh (also Romanized as Qarqatū’īyeh; also known as Gharghtoo’iyeh, Qargatū’īyeh, and Qarghaţū’īyeh) is a village in Esfandaqeh Rural District, in the Central District of Jiroft County, Kerman Province, Iran. At the 2006 census, its population was 199, in 45 families.

References 

Populated places in Jiroft County